Argyris Karagiannis (born 1 July 1903, date of death unknown) was a Greek sprinter. He competed in the men's 4 × 100 metres relay at the 1924 Summer Olympics.

References

External links
 

1903 births
Year of death missing
Athletes (track and field) at the 1924 Summer Olympics
Athletes (track and field) at the 1928 Summer Olympics
Greek male sprinters
Greek male pole vaulters
Olympic athletes of Greece
Place of birth missing